A home is a place of residence. In real estate usage, new or unoccupied dwelling units are often euphemistically called "homes" even though no one lives there.

Home may also refer to:

Places 
 Home, Kansas, U.S.
 Home, Pennsylvania, U.S.
 Home, Washington, U.S.
 Home, West Virginia, U.S.
 Home District, a former district of Upper Canada

People 
 Home (surname)
 Home, nickname of Sam Jones (1924–1981), American jazz bassist
 Clan Home, a Scottish family
 Earl of Home, a Scottish peerage title

Arts, entertainment, and media

Films 

 Home (1915 film), a 1915 silent film featuring A.V. Bramble
 Home, a 1919 American film directed by Lois Weber
 Home, a 1998 short film starring Alan Devine
 Home (2003 film), a UK TV dark comedy
 Home (2006 film), a documentary by Alan Cooke
 Home (2008 American film), an American drama film
 Home (2008 Swiss film), a Swiss drama
 Home (2009 film), a documentary by Yann Arthus-Bertrand
 Home (2011 film), a Russian drama film
 Home (2012 film), a Thai drama directed by Chookiat Sakveerakul
 Home (2013 film), an American drama film directed by Jono Oliver
 Home, the working title of the 2014 film At the Devil's Door
 Home (2015 film), a computer-animated film by DreamWorks Animation
 Home (2016 American film), an American horror film
 Home (2016 Belgian film), a Belgian film
 Home (2016 British film), a United Kingdom/Kosovo drama film
 Home (2020 film), a German-French-Dutch drama film
Home (2021 film), a Malayalam drama film

Literature
 Home (Coben novel), a 2016 novel by Harlan Coben
 Home (Inbari novel), a 2009 novel by Assaf Inbari
 Home (Mirbeau), a 1908 play by Octave Mirbeau
 Home (Morrison novel), a 2012 novel by Toni Morrison
 Home (play), a 1970 play by David Storey
 Home (Robinson novel), a 2008 novel by Marilynne Robinson
 Home: A Memoir of My Early Years, a 2008 book by Julie Andrews
 Home: A Short History of an Idea, a 1986 book by Witold Rybczynski

Music

Groups
 Home (American band), a 1990s pop group
 Home (British band), a 1970s rock group

Albums 

 Home (6cyclemind album), 2007
 Home (Angela Aki album), 2006
 Home (August Burns Red album), 2010
 Home (Bill Hardman album), 1978
 Home (Billy Strings album), 2019
 Home (Blessid Union of Souls album), 1995
 Home (Blue October album), 2016
 Home (BoDeans album), 1989
 Home (Carrie Akre album), 2000
 Home (Caspar Brötzmann Massaker album), 1995
 Home (Chris de Burgh album), 2012
 Home (Collective Soul album), 2006
 Home (Corrs album), 2005
 Home (David Murray album), 1982
 Home (Deep Blue Something album), 1994
 Home (Delaney & Bonnie album), 1969
 Home (Dierks Bentley album), 2012
 Home (Dixie Chicks album), 2002
 Home (Fool's Garden EP), 2008
 Home (Gabrielle Aplin EP), 2012
 Home!, a 1970 album by Gary Bartz
 Home (The Gathering album), 2006
 Home (Hip Hop Caucus album), 2014
 Home (Home album), by the UK group, 1972
 Home (Hothouse Flowers album), 1990
 Home (Josh Rouse album), 2000
 Home (Journey South album), 2007
 Home (Keller Williams album), 2003
 Home (Ken McIntyre album), 1976
 Home (Kian Egan album), 2014
 Home (Loretta Lynn album), 1975
 Home (Miriam Yeung EP), 2010
 Home (Hugh Masekela album), 1982
 Home (Monifah album), 2000
 Home (Mr. Children album), 2007
 Home (Nesli album), 2004
 Home (Nosaj Thing album), 2013
 Home (Procol Harum album), 1970
 Home (Rhye album), 2021
 Home (Roy Kim album), 2014
 Home (Rudimental album), 2013
 Home (Ryan Malcolm album), 2003
 Home (Sevendust album), 1999
 Home (Sheena Easton album), 1999
 Home (Shirley Murdock album), 2002
 Home (Simply Red album), 2003
 Home (Spearhead album), 1994
 Home (Stephanie Mills album), 1989
 Home (Steve Swallow album), 1980
 Home (Suze DeMarchi album), 2015
 Home (Terry Hall album), 1994
 Home (Wallace Roney album), 2012
 Home (The Wilkinsons album), 2007
 Home (Troy Cassar-Daley album), 2012
 Home™, a 2013 album by Vektroid
 Home (soundtrack), soundtrack album for the 2015 film Home
 Home: Songs of Hope & Journey, a 2006 Australian various-artists compilation
 Home, a 1997 album by Masayoshi Yamazaki
 Home, a 2003 album by This World Fair
 Home, a 2003 album by Jennifer Brown
 Home, a 2004 album by Benjamin Biolay and Chiara Mastroianni
 Home, a 2006 album by Magenta
 Home, a 2010 album by Jane Monheit
 Home, a 2015 album by Pat Green
 Home, a 2018 album by John Butler Trio
 Home, Part I, a 2014 album by Scott Matthews

Songs 

 "Home" (Alan Jackson song), 1989
 "Home" (Angela Aki song), 2005
 "Home" (B'z song), 1998
 "Home" (Basshunter song), 2019
 "Home" (Bone Thugs-n-Harmony song), 2003
 "Home" (BTS song), 2019
 "Home" (Daughtry song), 2007, covered by Kian Egan (2014)
 "Home" (Depeche Mode song), 1997
 "Home" (Dierks Bentley song), 2011
 "Home" (Edward Sharpe and the Magnetic Zeros song), 2010
 "Home" (Gabrielle Aplin song), 2013
 "Home" (Goo Goo Dolls song), 2010
 "Home" (Joe Diffie song), 1990
 "Home" (Kit Chan song), 1998
 "Home" (Kobi Marimi song), 2019 song that represented Israel in the Eurovision Song Contest 2019
 "Home" (La Toya Jackson song), 2003
 "Home" (Leah McFall song), 2014
 "Home" (Love Amongst Ruin song), 2010
 "Home" (Machine Gun Kelly, X Ambassadors and Bebe Rexha song), 2017
 "Home" (Madeon song), 2015
 "Home" (Martin Garrix song), 2019
 "Home" (Michael Bublé song), 2005, covered by Westlife (2007) and Blake Shelton (2008)
 "Home" (Naughty Boy song), 2014
 "Home" (Nick Jonas song), from the 2017 film Ferdinand
 "Home" (One Direction song), 2015
 "Home" (Phillip Phillips song), 2012
 "Home" (Rooster song), 2006
 "Home" (Sheryl Crow song), 1996
 "Home" (The Wiz song), from the 1975 musical The Wiz
 "Home" (Three Days Grace song), 2004
 "Home (When Shadows Fall)", a 1931 song written by Harry Clarkson, Geoffrey Clarkson and Peter van Steeden
 "Home", by Allan Holdsworth from Metal Fatigue
 "Home", by American Authors from Oh, What a Life
 "Home", by Aurora from All My Demons Greeting Me as a Friend
 "Home", by Blue October from Home
 "Home", by Breaking Benjamin from Saturate
 "Home", by Brian McKnight from Back at One
 "Home", by Caribou from Suddenly
 "Home", by Chris Tomlin from Never Lose Sight
 "Home", by Client Liaison from Diplomatic Immunity
 "Home", by Collective Soul from Youth
 "Home", by David Byrne and Brian Eno from Everything That Happens Will Happen Today
 "Home", by Deep Blue Something from Home
 "Home", by Dishwalla from Opaline
 "Home", by Dolly Parton from Blue Smoke
 "Home", by Dream Theater from Metropolis Pt. 2: Scenes from a Memory
 "Home", by Ellie Goulding from Bright Lights
 "Home", by Foo Fighters from Echoes, Silence, Patience & Grace
 "Home", by Framing Hanley from The Moment
 "Home", by Gemma Hayes from The Hollow of Morning
 "Home", by Guy Sebastian from Part 1
 "Home", by Iggy Pop from Brick by Brick
 "Home", by Jack Johnson from En Concert
 "Home", by Jay Brannan from Goddamned
 "Home", by Jenny Morris from Hit & Myth
 "Home", by Jerry Lee Lewis from Jerry Lee's Greatest
 "Home", by Jess Glynne from I Cry When I Laugh
 "Home", by Jethro Tull from Stormwatch
 "Home", by Joe Satriani from his self-titled album
 "Home", by Joe Walsh and Barnstorm from Barnstorm
 "Home", by John Butler Trio from Home
 "Home", by Karla Bonoff from Karla Bonoff
 "Home", by Katharine McPhee from Katharine McPhee
 "Home", by Lady Antebellum from Heart Break
 "Home", by LCD Soundsystem from This Is Happening
 "Home", by Lene Lovich from Stateless
 "Home", by Live from Songs from Black Mountain
 "Home", by Looner from the EP Year of the Ox
 "Home", by Mac Davis from Song Painter
 "Home", by Marc Broussard from Carencro
 "Home", by Marshmello from Joytime
 "Home", by Matt Brouwer from Unlearning
 "Home", by Midnight Oil from Breathe
 "Home", by Neutral Milk Hotel from Ferris Wheel on Fire
 "Home", by Nickelback from Feed the Machine
 "Home", by Nine Inch Nails from With Teeth
 "Home", by Passenger from Young as the Morning, Old as the Sea
 "Home", by Paul Van Dyk from Seven Ways
 "Home", by Persephone's Bees from Notes from the Underworld
 "Home", by Planetshakers from Lets Go
 "Home", by Public Image Ltd from Album
 "Home", by Robbie Williams from The Christmas Present
 "Home", by Roger Miller from Words and Music
 "Home", by Roger Waters from Radio K.A.O.S.
 "Home", by Roy Kim from Home
 "Home", by Safia from Internal
 "Home", by Sarah McLachlan from Solace
 "Home", by Simply Red from Home
 "Home", by Skunkhour
 "Home", by Smash Mouth from Astro Lounge
 "Home", by Spencer Sutherland and Victoria Justice from the 2021 film Afterlife of the Party
 "Home", by Staind from Dysfunction
 "Home", by Teenage Fanclub from Endless Arcade
 "Home", by Thirteen Senses from Crystal Sounds
 "Home", by Toby Fox, a track from the soundtrack of the 2015 video game Undertale
 "Home", by Tom Helsen and Geike Arnaert
 "Home", by Tom Petty from Highway Companion
 "Home", by Vanessa Carlton from Heroes & Thieves
 "Home", by the Ventures from Walk, Don't Run
 "Home", by Warrant from Rockaholic
 "Home", by Wendy Matthews from She
 "Home", by Westlife from Turnaround
 "Home", by Yellow Claw from Los Amsterdam
 "Home" (Bret's Story) and "Home" (C.C.'s Story), by Poison from Hollyweird
 "Home (Won't Let You Go)", by This Condition
 "Home", a song written by Joe Raposo from the 1977 film Raggedy Ann & Andy: A Musical Adventure

Radio 
 BBC Home Service, a BBC radio station 1939-1967
 Home Radio, a Philippine radio network operated by Aliw Broadcasting Corporation
 Pennine FM (formerly Home 107.9), a radio station in Huddersfield, West Yorkshire, England, in the United Kingdom

Television

Channels
 HGTV (British and Irish TV channel), formerly Home, a UK lifestyle channel

Series
 Home (1954 TV program), a 1954–1957 American lifestyle magazine and talk show television program that aired on NBC
 Home (1988 TV program), a 1988–1994 American talk show that aired on American Broadcasting Company (ABC)
 Home (Australian TV series), a 1983 Australian drama television series that aired on Australian Broadcasting Corporation (ABC) 
 Home (British TV series), a 2019 British comedy television series
 Home (2020 TV series), a 2020 American documentary web series
 The Home Show, a 1956–1957 Australian TV show
 Home: Adventures with Tip & Oh, a 2017 animated series on Netflix

Episodes
 "Home" (Angel)
 "Home" (Battlestar Galactica)
 "Home" (Boardwalk Empire)
 "Home" (Class of 3000)
 "Home" (Game of Thrones)
 "Home" (Glee)
 "Home" (Lego Ninjago: Masters of Spinjitzu)
 "Home" (Once Upon a Time in Wonderland)
 "Home" (Sons of Anarchy)
 "Home" (Star Trek: Enterprise)
 "Home" (Stargate Atlantis)
 "Home" (Supernatural)
 "Home" (The Walking Dead)
 "Home" (The X-Files)

Brands and enterprises 
 Home (nightclub chain), two clubs, in Sydney and London, specialising in house music
 Home (nightclub), the defunct London club

Computing and technology 
 Home (Apple), a bundled application within the Apple iOS
 Facebook Home, user interface layer for Android smartphones developed by Facebook
 Google Home, a line of smart speakers by Google
 Home button, a user interface element of most web browsers
 Home directory, a file directory on an operating system
 Home key, a key on computer keyboards
 Home page, a page on a website
 Home row, the central row of keys on a keyboard, important in touch typing
 Home signal, a railway signal
 PlayStation Home, a gaming networking service

Organizations and institutions 
 HOME (Manchester), an arts venue in Manchester, England
 Heterosexuals Organized for a Moral Environment, a U.S. anti-gay organization
 HOME Investment Partnerships Program, a U.S. federal assistance program
 Humanitarian Organization for Migration Economics, a social welfare organization in Singapore
 Nursing home, a residence facility for people requiring constant care
 Project H.O.M.E., a non-profit organization
 Retirement home, a multi-residence facility for elderly people

Sports
 Home (sports), the city or field where a team generally plays
 Home plate or home base, the final base in baseball

Ships
 , an American schooner that sank in Lake Michigan in 1858

See also 
 The Home, Australian magazine
 Home Again (disambiguation)
 Home Free (disambiguation)
 Home Islands (disambiguation)
 Home Sweet Home (disambiguation)
 Home Township (disambiguation)
 Homes (disambiguation)
 Homing (disambiguation)
 Hume (disambiguation)